Stefan Mogens Paldan (born 27 October 1971) is a Swedish former professional footballer who played as a midfielder. He was a squad member for Sweden at the 1991 FIFA World Youth Championship and the 1992 UEFA European Under-21 Championship.

References

1971 births
Living people
Swedish footballers
Östers IF players
SK Brann players
Association football midfielders
Swedish expatriate footballers
Expatriate footballers in Norway
Swedish expatriate sportspeople in Norway
Allsvenskan players
Eliteserien players
Sweden youth international footballers
Sweden under-21 international footballers